Naaraaz is a 1994 Indian Hindi-language action drama film directed by Mahesh Bhatt, starring Mithun Chakraborty, Pooja Bhatt, Atul Agnihotri, Sonali Bendre and Gulshan Grover.

Plot
Naaraaz is the story of wealthy Ajay Pandit and poor Deva, played by Atul Agnihotri and Mithun Chakraborty, respectively, and their love and friendship.

Snippets
This is Mithun's second film after Tadipaar with Mahesh Bhatt. The film's musical score is by Anu Malik and audio is available on Tips Music Films. All three of the main leads in the film, Mithun Chakraborty, Atul Agnihotri and Pooja Bhatt later appeared in another film, Gunehgar (1995).

Cast
Mithun Chakraborty as Deva (Cameo appearance)
Pooja Bhatt as Sonia (Comeo appearance in face)
Atul Agnihotri as Ajay
Sonali Bendre as Sonali Child/Item Aisa Tadpaya
Gulshan Grover as Raghu (Reborn) Taoke Died 
Soni Razdan as Sabrina (Reborn)/Samina
Avtar Gill as Preetam Singh
Kunal Khemu as Young Ajay

Soundtrack
The soundtrack of the film was composed by Anu Malik. "Sambhala Hai Maine" was one of the many hit songs of the soundtrack, sung by Kumar Sanu and picturised on Atul Agnihotri and Sonali Bendre.

References

External links
 

1994 films
1990s Hindi-language films
Mithun's Dream Factory films
Films shot in Ooty
Films directed by Mahesh Bhatt
Films scored by Anu Malik